Babysitting 2 is a 2015 French comedy film shot in the "found footage" style. It is directed by Nicolas Benamou and Philippe Lacheau. The film is the sequel to Babysitting.

Cast

 Philippe Lacheau as Franck
 Alice David as Sonia
 Vincent Desagnat as Ernest
 Tarek Boudali as Sam
 Valériane de Villeneuve as Yolande
 Julien Arruti as Alex
 Charlotte Gabris as Estelle
 Grégoire Ludig as Paul
 David Marsais as Jean
 Christian Clavier as  Alain
 Jérôme Commandeur as Michel Massieye
 Valérie Karsenti as Madame Massieye
 Élodie Fontan as Julie
 Jean-Luc Couchard as Marco
 Elisa Bachir Bey as Erika
 Joséphine Drai as Joséphine
 Ken Samuels as John
 Aílton Carmo as Pedro
 Beto Benites as The chief of rescue workers
 Luis Eduardo dos Reis Pachêco as Joao

References

External links 
 

2015 films
2010s French-language films
French comedy films
2015 comedy films
Found footage films
French sequel films
Films shot in Brazil
Films directed by Philippe Lacheau
2010s French films